"Collateral Damage" is the second episode of the second season of the HBO original series The Wire. The episode was written by David Simon from a story by Simon and Ed Burns and was directed by Ed Bianchi. It originally aired on June 8, 2003.

Guest stars
Seth Gilliam as Detective Ellis Carver
Domenick Lombardozzi as Detective Thomas "Herc" Hauk
Jim True-Frost as Detective Roland "Prez" Pryzbylewski
James Ransone as Ziggy Sobotka
Pablo Schreiber as Nick Sobotka
Michael Hyatt as Brianna Barksdale
Bill Raymond as The Greek
Al Brown as Major Stan Valchek
Hassan Johnson as Roland "Wee-Bey" Brice
Delaney Williams as Sergeant Jay Landsman
Maria Broom as Marla Daniels
Luray Cooper as Nat Coxson
Erik Todd Dellums as Randall Frazier
Charley Scalies as Thomas "Horseface" Pakusa
Chris Ashworth as Sergei Malatov
Gerard Ender as Sam
Jeffrey Fugitt as Claude Diggins
Brook Yeaton as "White" Mike McArdle

Plot summary
Beadie deals with various agencies trying to decide which will investigate the bodies she found in the shipping container. The coroner determines the women suffocated because of a crushed air pipe on the top of the container. The damage to the pipe is deemed accidental and the case is handed back to Beadie. Meanwhile, Bunk learns that McNulty spent three hours working out where his floater was dumped in order to establish that it fell under Rawls' jurisdiction. McNulty examines the container and meets Beadie. They establish that the floater that he found in the harbor is related, as there is an extra bedroll in the container. McNulty finds that the air pipe has been crushed deliberately. Beadie and McNulty meet with the coroner, who agrees that this is grounds to consider the deaths as homicides.

Rawls meets with Ronnie, the commander of the Port Authority, and resists an attempt to hand off the Jane Doe cases. Meanwhile, McNulty convinces the coroner to estimate the time of death to see if it matches when the other girl was dumped. Rawls meets with the commanders of the other jurisdictions involved with the Jane Does, who all insist that the murders occurred in his jurisdiction. The cases are subsequently assigned to Homicide, initially to Ray Cole, but subsequently reassigned to Freamon and Bunk.  The pair travel to the Port Authority and meet with Beadie, where they decide to travel to Philadelphia, as that's where the ship that carried the container is now docked. There, they interrogate the crew. McNulty awakens naked and hungover in Rhonda Pearlman's bed while Daniels talks with his wife Marla about his career. Daniels says he will hand in his resignation papers.

Frank meets with his smuggling contact Spiros "Vondas" Vondopoulos, insisting on being informed when human cargo moves through the docks. Afterward, Vondas speaks to another man in the cafe, who happens to be The Greek. Back at the union house, Horseface and Ott complain about harassment by the police, who Frank learns are acting under orders from Valchek. The next day, Valchek accuses Frank of illegally funding the stained glass window he donated to their church. After Frank threatens him, Valchek visits a property developer, Andy Krawczyk, and learns that Frank's union, despite its financial troubles, has given large political contributions. Valchek meets with Ervin Burrell, in line to be appointed Commissioner, and promises to rally support for him on the City Council in return for a detail investigating the union; Burrell gives him a squad of six men for six weeks.

At the bar, Ziggy asks his cousin Nick to partner with him in selling drugs through a connection named "White Mike." Nick refuses his offer. On the way to a job, the stevedores are stopped at a police DUI checkpoint led by Sergeant Ellis Carver. Ziggy meets White Mike and asks him to give him the package with payment to follow, but Mike refuses since Ziggy has messed up his last two attempts. After the stevedores are released, Horseface infiltrates Valchek's district station and steals a surveillance van filled with equipment. He drives it to the docks and La La, Frank, and Nick help him load it into a container. Valchek assembles and briefs his new detail, including Prez, in their port side offices.

Brianna Barksdale visits her brother Avon in prison and pleads with him to look out for her son D'Angelo, as he took a 20-year sentence for their family. When Brianna informs him that the New York Dominicans are no longer doing business with the Barksdales, Avon recommends an Atlanta contact named Vargas. Brianna and Avon also note that D'Angelo's girlfriend Donette has not been keeping in touch with him. Wee-Bey Brice is harassed by a corrections officer named Dwight Tilghman, who is the cousin of one of the victims of a crime that Wee-Bey took the fall for. Avon tells Stringer that he needs to help with Tilghman and asks that he find Donette. Stringer questions D'Angelo's loyalty, but Avon insists he can be trusted. Avon finds D'Angelo snorting heroin with another inmate and tells him that they need to talk.

Using fake Coast Guard identification, Serge and an associate go to Philadelphia and order the ship held in port. When one of the crewmen comes ashore, they chase him down, beat him, and throw him into the back seat. Serge and the associate violently interrogate the crewman, who turns out to be a Turk named Sam. After Vondas and The Greek arrive, Sam initially pleads for his life in Greek, but after an ostensibly kind request from The Greek to tell him what happened, he admits that he allowed his crew access to the smuggled prostitutes in exchange for money and that one of them was killed when she resisted. Her body was dumped overboard while the crew killed the other women to silence them. Once Sam's tale is finished, Vondas slowly cuts his throat. The Greek orders Serge to leave the corpse without fingerprints or a face.

First appearances
"White" Mike McArdle: East side drug dealer who has supplied Ziggy Sobotka with packages in the past.
CO Dwight Tilghman: Embittered correctional officer whose cousin was killed by Wee-Bey Brice.
Andy Krawczyk: Property developer and political fundraiser.
This is the first episode that deals with Ervin Burrell being promoted to Acting Commissioner.

Reception
The episode had an average of 3.5 million viewers when it was first broadcast on HBO on June 8, 2003. This was a reduction of 21% from the previous week's season premiere.

References

External links
"Collateral Damage" at HBO.com

The Wire (season 2) episodes
2003 American television episodes
Television episodes directed by Ed Bianchi
Television episodes written by David Simon